General elections were held in Tunisia on 2 April 1989. It was the first time presidential elections had been held since 1974, as Habib Bourguiba had been declared President-for-life the following year. However, his replacement, Zine El Abidine Ben Ali, was the only candidate to obtain endorsements from 30 political figures, as required by the Constitution.  As a result, he was unopposed for a full term.

In the Chamber of Deputies election, the Constitutional Democratic Rally (a renamed Socialist Destourian Party) won 80.6 percent of the vote and all 141 seats. According to official figures, voter turnout was 76.5% in the parliamentary election and 76.1% in the presidential election.

Results

President

Chamber of Deputies
Although the elections were the closest Tunisia had come to a free election at the time, the results were heavily contested. Different sources offer ostensibly official figures that diverge significantly, particularly in respect to the share of votes received by the Ennahda Movement. Without official recognition as a party, the party fielded independent candidates that received between 10% and 17% of the vote nationally according to different "official" results quoted by different academics.

Aftermath
Both the legal opposition and the Ennahda Movement accused the government of electoral fraud, with the Ennahda Movement claiming to have received between 60-80% of the vote. According to other analysts, the elections demonstrated the staying power of the state party RCD, which had expanded its membership in the run-up to the election to encompass nearly 40% of the registered electorate

References

1989 in Tunisia
Elections in Tunisia
Tunisia
1989
April 1989 events in Africa